Federation of Tackheads is an album by the Parliament-Funkadelic spin off act, Jimmy G and the Tackheads. The band was led by George Clinton's younger brother Jimmy Giles and features various musicians and singers from the P-Funk musical collective.

Federation of Tackheads was released in 1985 by Capitol Records. It was produced by Clinton, Steve Washington, DeWayne "Blackbyrd" McKnight and Garry Shider.

In 2004, EMI in the UK reissued the album Federation of Tackheads featuring liner notes written by Rickey Vincent, author of Funk: The Music, The People, and the Rhythm of the One.

Track listing
"Break My Heart" (Clinton, Washington, Washington) (released as 12" single Capitol V-15215)
"Clockwork" (Johnson, Clinton, Washington)
"All Or Nothin'" (Clinton, Washington, Washington)
"Lies" (J. Keaton, E. Eatmon) (released as 12" single Capitol V-8648)
"Slingshot" (Clinton, Washington, Shider)
"I Want Yo Daughter" (Keaton, Rogers, Clinton, Williamson)
"Family Funk" (Clinton, Washington, Keaton)

Personnel
DeWayne "Blackbyrd" McKnight, Steve Washington, Garry Shider, Tony Thomas, Andre Foxxe - guitar
Jimmy G, Steve Washington - bass
Dean Ragland - drums
Steve Washington, Jimmy G and Steve Washington on "Lies" - drum programming
Steve Washington - keyboards
Jimmy G, Robert Johnson, George Clinton, Garry Shider, Ron Ford, Sheila Washington, Linda Shider, Sandra Feva, Mallia Franklin, Pat Lewis, Daryl Clinton, Cheryl James, Patty Curry, Lige Curry, Dean Ragland, Joe Harris, Rod Simpson, Kenny Colton - vocals

Jimmy G and the Tackheads albums
1985 albums
Capitol Records albums
Albums with cover art by Pedro Bell